A - B - C - D - E - F - G - H - I - J - K - L - M - N - O - P - Q - R - S - T - U - V - W - XYZ

This is a list of rivers in the United States that have names starting with the letter G.  For the main page, which includes links to listings by state, see List of rivers in the United States.

Ga  
Gakona River - Alaska
Gale River - New Hampshire
Galena River - Wisconsin, Illinois
Galien River - Michigan
Gallatin River - Wyoming, Montana
Garcia River - California
Gasconade River - Missouri
Gasper River - Kentucky
Gauley River - West Virginia

Ge - Go 
Genesee River - Pennsylvania, New York
Gibbon River - Wyoming
Gila River - New Mexico, Arizona
Glady Fork of the Cheat River - West Virginia
Glover River - Oklahoma
Goodhope River - Alaska
Goose Creek - Virginia

Gr 
Grand River - Michigan
Grand River - Missouri, Iowa
Grand River - Ohio
Grand River - Oklahoma
Grand River - North and South Dakota
Grand River - Wisconsin
Grand Calumet River - Indiana
Grande Ronde River - Oregon, Washington
Grant River - Wisconsin
Grass River - Michigan
Grasse River - New York
Gray Wolf River - Washington
Grays River - Washington
Great Brook - New Hampshire
Great Brook - New Jersey
Great Chazy River - New York
Great Egg Harbor River - New Jersey
Great Miami River - Ohio
Great Trough Creek - Pennsylvania
Great Works River - Maine
Green River - Illinois
Green River - Kentucky
Green River, a tributary of the Housatonic River in Massachusetts and New York
Green River, a tributary of the Hoosic River in Massachusetts
Green River, a tributary of the Deerfield River in Massachusetts and Vermont
Green River - North Carolina
Green River - North Dakota
Green River - Tennessee
Green River - Utah, Colorado, Wyoming
Green River, a tributary of the Duwamish River in Washington
Green River, a tributary of North Fork Toutle River in Washington
Green Fall River - Connecticut, Rhode Island
Greenbrier River - West Virginia
Greenwater River - Washington
Greys River - Wyoming
Gridley River - New Hampshire
Gros Ventre River - Wyoming

Gu 
Guadalupe River - California
Guadalupe River - Texas
Gualala River - California
Guest River - Virginia
Gulkana River - Alaska
Gunnison River - Colorado
Gunpowder River - Pennsylvania, Maryland
Gunstock River - New Hampshire
Guyandotte River - West Virginia

G